Brian Charlesworth  (born 29 April 1945) is a British evolutionary biologist at the University of Edinburgh, and editor of Biology Letters.
Since 1997, he has been Royal Society Research Professor at the Institute of Evolutionary Biology (IEB) in Edinburgh. He has been married since 1967 to the British evolutionary biologist Deborah Charlesworth.

Education
Charlesworth gained a Bachelor of Arts degree in Biological Sciences from Queens' College, Cambridge, followed by a PhD in genetics in 1969 for research into genetic variation in viability in the fruit fly Drosophila melanogaster.

Career
Following his PhD, Charlesworth did postdoctoral research  at the University of Chicago, University of Liverpool 1971–1974 and the University of Sussex under John Maynard Smith 1974–82. He returned to Chicago, to be professor of ecology and evolution from 1985 to 1997 after which he moved to Edinburgh.

Research
Charlesworth has worked extensively on understanding sequence evolution, using the fruit fly as a model species, and has also contributed theoretical work on aging, the evolution of recombination and the evolution of sex chromosomes.

In April 2010, the journal Philosophical Transactions of the Royal Society B was dedicated to honour Brian's contribution to the field of population genetics.

Awards and honours
Charlesworth was elected a Fellow of the Royal Society (FRS) in 1991, and won its Darwin Medal in 2000.  He won the 2006 Frink Medal, of the Zoological Society of London and in 2010 was awarded the Darwin-Wallace Medal of the Linnean Society. His nomination for the Royal Society reads: 

In 2015, the Genetics Society of America awarded Charlesworth its Thomas Hunt Morgan Medal. This award is give to recognize "lifetime achievement in the field of genetics. It recognizes the full body of work of an exceptional geneticist," according to the Thomas Hunt Morgan Medal webpage.

References

1945 births
Living people
British evolutionary biologists
Population geneticists
Alumni of Queens' College, Cambridge
Academics of the University of Edinburgh
Fellows of the Royal Society
Fellows of the Royal Society of Edinburgh
Foreign associates of the National Academy of Sciences